Nils Eugen Storå (born 29 May 1933) is a Finnish ethnologist.

He was born in Jakobstad. He was employed at Åbo Academy in 1959, and took his doctorate in 1968. From 1972 to 1997 he was a professor of Nordic ethnology, among others with an emphasis on skerry guard culture. He is a member of the Norwegian Academy of Science and Letters.

He married librarian Siv Storå in 1958.

References

1933 births
Living people
Swedish-speaking Finns
Finnish ethnologists
Academic staff of Åbo Akademi University
Members of the Norwegian Academy of Science and Letters